This is a 'timeline of Taiwanese history', comprising important legal and territorial changes and political events in Taiwan and its predecessor states.  To read about the background to these events, see History of Taiwan and History of the Republic of China. See also the list of rulers of Taiwan.

3rd century

7th century

12th century

13th century

14th century

16th century

17th century

18th century

19th century

20th century

21st century

Citations

References 

 . Reprinted 1995, SMC Publishing, Taipei.

External links 
 Time Mapping Taiwan – YouTube

Taiwanese